Adriana, also spelled Adrianna, is a Latin name and feminine form of Adrian. It originates from present day Italy.

Translations

Arabic: أدريان
Belorussian: Адрыяна (Adryjana)
Bulgarian: Адриана (Adriana)
Chinese Simplified: 阿德里安娜 (Ā délǐ ānnà)
Chinese Traditional: 阿德里安娜 (Ā délǐ ān
Greek: Αδριανή (Adriani)
Gujarati: એડ્રીયાના (Ēḍrīyānā)
Hebrew: אדריאנה 
Hindi: एड्रियाना (Ēḍriyānā)
Japanese: アドリアーナ (Adoriāna)
Kannada: ಆಡ್ರಿಯಾನಾ (Āḍriyānā)
Korean: 아드리아나 (Adeuliana)
Latvian:Ādriana (Aadriana)
Persian: آدریانا
Polish: Adrianna
Russian: Адриана 
Serbian: Адријана (Adrijana)
Tamil: அட்ரியானா (Aṭriyāṉā)
Telugu: అడ్రియానా (Aḍriyānā)
Ukrainian: Адріана 
Yiddish: אַדריאַנאַ

Adriana
Given name
Adriana (footballer, born 1968), American-Brazilian footballer
Adriana (footballer, born 1996), Brazilian footballer
Adriana of Nassau-Siegen (1449–1477), Dutch countess
Adriana Abascal (born 1970), Mexican model
Adriana Abenia (born 1984), Spanish television presenter, model, and actress
Adriana Achcińska (born 2002), Polish footballer
Adriana Acosta (born 1956, missing since 1978), Argentine militant and field hockey player
Adriana Admiraal-Meijerink (1893–1992), Dutch fencer
Adriana Aguirre (born 1951), Argentine actress and vedette
Adriana Ailincăi (born 1999), Romanian rower
Adriana Aizemberg (born 1938), Argentine film and television actress
Adriana Albini (born 1955), Italian pathologist and cancer researcher
Adriana Altaras (born 1960), German actress, theatre director, and writer
Adriana Alves (born 1995), Angolan sprinter
Adriana Ambesi (born 1944), Italian actress
Adriana Ampuero (born 1987), Chilean lawyer
Adriana Angeles (born 1979), Mexican judoka
Adriana Aparecida Costa (born 1983), Brazilian footballer
Adriana Aparecida da Silva (born 1981), Brazilian long-distance runner
Adriana Araújo (born 1981), Brazilian boxer
Adriana Arboleda (born 1977/1978), Colombian model and presenter
Adriana Arydes (born 1973), Brazilian singer and songwriter
Adriana Asti (born 1933), Italian actress
Adriana Barbu (born 1961), Romanian long distance runner
Adriana Barna (born 1978), German tennis player
Adriana Barraza (born 1956), Mexican actress and director
Adriana Barrientos (born 1980), Chilean model
Adriana Barré (born 1995), Ecuadorian footballer
Adriana Basarić (born 1982), Bosnia and Herzegovina tennis player
Adriana Basile (1580–1640), Italian composer
Adriana Bazon (born 1963), Romanian rower
Adriana Behar (born 1969), Brazilian volleyball player
Adriana Benetti (1919-2016), Italian actress
Adriana Benitez (1975–2000), Columbian murder victim
Adriana Bertini, Brazilian artist
Adriana Betancur (born 1983), Colombian television presenter and model
Adriana Biagiotti (born 1947), Italian gymnast
Adriana Bianco (born 1941), known professionally as Adrianita, Argentine actress
Adriana Birolli (born 1986), Brazilian actress
Adriana Bisi Fabbri (1881–1918), Italian painter
Adriana Bittel (born 1946), Romanian literary critic and writer
Adriana Bombom, Brazilian dancer, model, television host, and actress
Adriana Bortolozzi (born 1949), Argentine politician
Adriana Breukink (1957–2022), Dutch recorder player and maker
Adriana Briscoe, American evolutionary biologist
Adriana Brodsky (born 1955), Argentine actress
Adriana Budevska (1878–1955), Bulgarian actress
Adriana Cabrera (born 1992), Puerto Rican handballer
Adriana Cáceres (born 1982), Argentine political scientist and politician
Adriana Calcanhotto (born 1965), Brazilian singer-songwriter
Adriana Calderón (born 2003), Mexican climate activist
Adriana Calvo (1947–2010), Argentine physicist, professor, and researcher
Adriana Camelli (1928–1996), Argentine swimmer
Adriana Campos (1979–2015), Colombian actress
Adriana Cancino (born 1963), Chilean politician and teacher
Adriana Carabalí, Columbian politician
Adriana Cardoso de Castro (born 1990), is a Brazilian handballer
Adriana Carmona (born 1972), Venezuelan taekwondo practitioner
Adriana Caselotti (1916–1997), American actress and singer
Adriana Castelán Macías (born 1983), Mexican politician
Adriana Castillo (born 1990), Uruguayan footballer
Adriana Cataño, American actress, businesswoman, and television host
Adriana Cavarero (born 1947), Italian philosopher and feminist thinker
Adriana Chechik (born 1991), American pornographic actress and internet personality
Adriana Cecilia Mitroi (born 1994), Romanian gymnast
Adriana Cerezo (born 2003), Spanish taekwondo athlete
Adriana Chamajová (born 1971), Slovak basketball player
Adriana Cisneros (born 1979), Venezuelan businesswoman
Adriana Comolli (born 1951), Argentine swimmer
Adriana Corona (born 1980), Mexican triathlete
Adriana Corral (born 1983), American artist
Adriana Crăciun (born 1989), Romanian handballer
Adriana Crisci (born 1982), Italian gymnast
Adriana Crispo (16th century), Greek ruler in the Cyclades
Adriana Cristina Serquis (born 1967), Argentine physicist and researcher
Adriana Dadci (born 1979), Polish judoka
Adriana Dávila (born 1979), Peruvian footballer
Adriana Dávila Fernández (born 1970), Mexican politician
Adriana de Barros (born 1976), Portuguese-Canadian illustrator, web designer, and poet
Adriana de Vecchi (1896–1995), Portuguese cellist and educator
Adriana DeMeo (born 1981), American actress 
Adriana DeSanctis (born 1988), Canadian figure skater
Adriana Degreas (born 1971), Brazilian fashion designer
Adriana Delpiano (born 1947), Chilean politician
Adriana Diaz (born 1984), American television journalist
Adriana Díaz (born 2000), Puerto Rican table tennis player
Adriana Díaz Contreras (born 1970), Mexican politician
Adriana Dorn (born 1986), Nicaraguan beauty pageant titleholder
Adriana Dunavska (born 1969), Bulgarian gymnast
Adriana Dutkiewicz, Australian sedimentologist
Adriana Espinosa (born 1991), Ecuadorian archer
Adriana Esteves (born 1969), Brazilian actress
Adriana Evans (born 1974), American R&B vocalist
Adriana Falcão (born 1960), Brazilian screenwriter
Adriana Faranda (born 1950), Italian terrorist
Adriana Farmiga (born 1974), Ukrainian American artist
Adriana Fernández (born 1971), Mexican long-distance runner
Adriana Ferrarese del Bene (c. 1755–1804), Italian operatic soprano
Adriana Ferreyr (born 1983), Brazilian actress and entrepreneur
Adriana Flores (born 1991), Salvadoran footballer
Adriana Fonseca (born 1979), Mexican actress
Adriana Font (born 1998), Puerto Rican footballer
Adriana Fuentes Cortés (born 1968), Mexican politician
Adriana Fuentes Téllez (born 1960), Mexican politician
Adriana Galvan, American psychologist
Adriana Garlobo (born 1988), Cuban water polo player
Adriana Garroni (born 1966), Italian mathematician 
Adriana Gascoigne, American technology executive and activist
Adriana Gaviria, American actor, producer, director, writer, and advocate
Adriana Gerši (born 1976), Czech tennis player
Adriana Gil, Bolivian politician
Adriana Giramonti (1929–2016), Italian-American chef
Adriana Giuffrè (born 1939), Italian actress
Adriana Gjonaj, Albanian politician
Adriana González Carrillo (born 1975), Mexican politician
Adriana González-Peñas (born 1986), Spanish tennis player
Adriana Guerrini (1907–1970), Italian operatic soprano
Adriana Guzmán (born 1992), Mexican tennis player
Adriana Hernández (born 2003), Mexican rhythmic gymnast
Adriana Hernández Íñiguez (born 1978), Mexican politician
Adriana Hinojosa Céspedes (born 1972), Mexican politician
Adriana Hoffmann (1940–2022), Chilean botanist
Adriana Hölszky (born 1953), Romanian-German music educator, composer, and pianist
Adriana Hunter, British translator
Adriana Iliescu (born 1938), Romanian professor, philologist, and author 
Adriana Innocenti (1926–2016), Italian actress
Adriana Iturbide (born 1993), Mexican footballer
Adriana Ivancich (1930–1983), Italian noble woman and poet
Adriana Janacópulos (1897– c. 1978), Brazilian sculptor
Adriana Jelinkova (born 1992), Dutch alpine ski racer
Adriana Jiménez (born 1985), Mexican high diver
Adriana Johanna Bake (1724-1787), Dutch governor's wife in the East Indies
Adriana Johanna Haanen (1814–1895), Dutch painter
Adriana Johanna Taylor (born 1946), Dutch-born Australian politician
Adriana Kaegi (born 1957), Swiss-American actress, producer, and singer
Adriana Kaplan Marcusán (born 1956), Argentine anthropologist
Adriana Konjarski (born 1995), Australian footballer
Adriana Kostiw (born 1974), Brazilian sailor
Adriana Krnáčová (born 1960), Czech businesswoman and politician
Adriana Kugler, Colombian-American economist
Adriana Kučerová (born 1976), Slovak operatic soprano
Adriana LaGrange (born 1961/62), Canadian politician
Adriana Lamar (1909–1946), Mexican actress
Adriana Lastra (born 1979), Spanish politician
Adriana Lavat (born 1974), Mexican actress and television host
Adriana Leon (born 1992), Canadian soccer player
Adriana Lessa (born 1971), Brazilian actress, singer, television presenter, and dancer
Adriana Lestido (born 1955), Argentine photographer
Adriana Lima (born 1981), Brazilian supermodel and former Victoria's Secret Angel
Adriana Lisboa (born 1970), Brazilian writer
Adriana Lita, American materials scientist
Adriana Lleras-Muney, Columbian-American economist
Adriana López Moreno (born 1978), Mexican politician
Adriana Louvier (born 1983), Mexican actress and presenter
Adriana Lovera (born 1985), Venezuelan road cyclist
Adriana Maas (1702–1746), Dutch stage actress
Adriana Maggs, Canadian actress, director, and writer
Adriana Maldonado López, Spanish politician
Adriana Maliponte (born 1938), Italian operatic soprano
Adriana Marais (born 1983), South African theoretical physicist, technologist, and explorer
Adriana Maraž (1931–2015), Slovene graphic artist
Adriana Marmolejo (born 1982), Mexican swimmer
Adriana Marmorek (born 1969), Colombian artist
Adriana Martín (born 1986), Spanish footballer
Adriana Martín (born 1996), Spanish archer
Adriana Mather, American actress, novelist, and film producer
Adriana Medveďová (born 1992), Slovak handballer
Adriana Melo (born 1976), Brazilian comic book artist and penciler
Adriana Millard (born 1926), Chilean sprinter
Adriana Miller, American dancer
Adriana Moisés Pinto (born 1978), Brazilian basketball player
Adriana Molinari (born 1967), Argentine beauty pageant winner, model, exotic dancer, and actress
Adriana Monsalve (born 1977), Venezuelan sportscaster and journalist
Adriana Monti (born 1951), Italian-Canadian film director, producer, and screenwriter
Adriana Muñoz (born 1982), Cuban middle-distance runner
Adriana Muñoz D'Albora (born 1948), Chilean sociologist and politician
Adriana Muriel, Colombian racing cyclist
Adriana Nanclares (born 2002), Spanish football goalkeeper
Adriana of Nassau-Siegen (1449–1477), German Countess
Adriana Năstase-Simion-Zamfir (born 1972), Romanian table tennis player
Adriana Nechita (born 1983), Romanian handballer
Adriana Nelson (born 1980), Romanian-American long-distance runner
Adriana Neumann de Oliveira (born 1980), Brazilian mathematician
Adriana Nieto (born 1978), Mexican actress
Adriana Nikolova (born 1988), Bulgarian chess player
Adriana Ocampo (born 1955), Colombian planetary geologist
Adriana Olguín (1911–2015), Chilean lawyer and politician
Adriana Ozores (born 1959), Spanish actress
Adriana Paniagua (born 1995), Nicaraguan model and beauty pageant winner
Adriana Parente (born 1980), Brazilian footballer
Adriana Paz (born 1980), Mexican actress and dancer
Adriana Pereira (born 1964), Brazilian swimmer
Adriana Pérez (born 1992), Venezuelan tennis player
Adriana Pesci, Argentine mathematician and mathematical physicist
Adriana Petit (born 1984), Spanish artist
Adriana Peña (born 1964), Uruguayan dentist and politician
Adriana Pichardo, Venezuelan politician
Adriana Pincherle (1905–1996), Italian painter
Adriana Poli Bortone (born 1943), Italian politician
Adriana Pop (born 1965), French-Romanian gymnastics choreographer and gymnast
Adriana Porter (1857–1946), Canadian-American alleged witch
Adriana Prieto (1950–1974), Brazilian actress
Adriana Prosenjak (born 1963), Croatian handball player and coach
Adriana Puiggrós (born 1941), Argentine writer, academic, and politician
Adriana E. Ramírez, American writer
Adriana Randall, South African politician
Adriana Reami (born 1997), American tennis player
Adriana Rendón (born 1971), Colombian sport shooter
Adriana Reverón (born 1985), Spanish model and beauty pageant winner
Adriana Riveramelo (born 1970), Mexican journalist, presenter, and television actress
Adriana Rodrigues (born 1992), Portuguese footballer
Adriana Rodríguez (born 1999), Cuban long jumper
Adriana Rodríguez Vizcarra (born 1949), Mexican politician
Adriana Roel (1934–2022), Mexican actress
Adriana Romero (born 1979), Colombian actress
Adriana Rozwadowska, Polish journalist
Adriana Ruano (born 1995), Guatemalan sports shooter
Adriana Russo (born 1954), Italian actress and television personality
Adriana Sachs (born 1993), Argentine footballer
Adriana Săftoiu (born 1967), Romanian politician
Adriana Salazar Varón (born 1963), Colombian chess player
Adriana Salvatierra (born 1989), Bolivian political scientist and politician
Adriana Samuel (born 1966), Brazilian volleyball player
Adriana Santos (born 1971), Brazilian basketball player
Adriana Sarur (born 1974), Mexican politician
Adriana Seroni (1922–1984), Italian journalist and politician
Adriana Serra (1923–1995), Italian actress
Adriana Serra Zanetti (born 1976), Italian tennis player
Adriana Sivieri (born 1918), Argentine-Italian actress
Adriana Sklenarikova (born 1971), Slovak actress and fashion model
Adriana Smits (born 1967), Dutch archer
Adriana Sosnovschi (born 1998), Moldovan tennis player
Adriana Spilberg (1652–1700), Dutch painter
Adriana Szili (born 1985), Australian tennis player
Adriana Taranto (born 1999), Australian footballer
Adriana Tarasov, Romanian sprint canoer
Adriana Taylor (born 1946), Australian politician
Adriana Terrazas Porras (born 1966), Mexican politician
Adriana Tirado (born 1998), Puerto Rican footballer
Adriana Torrebejano (born 1991), Spanish actress
Adriana Trigiani (born 1970), American novelist, television writer, producer and film director
Adriana Turea (born 1975), Romanian luger
Adriana Ugarte (born 1985), Spanish actress
Adriana Umaña-Taylor, American psychologist and professor
Adriana Vacarezza (born 1961), Chilean actress
Adriana Valdés (born 1943), Chilean writer
Adriana van der Plaats (born 1971), Dutch swimmer
Adriana van Ravenswaay (1816–1872), Dutch painter
Adriana van Tongeren (c.1691–1764), Dutch stage actress
Adriana Varejão (born 1964), Brazilian artist
Adriana Varela (born 1952), Argentine tango singer
Adriana Vargas, Colombian journalist
Adriana Vasini (born 1987), Venezuelan beauty queen and 2nd runner-up at Miss World 2010
Adriana Vega (born 1960), Spanish actress
Adriana Venegas (born 1989), Costa Rican footballer
Adriana Vieyra Olivares (born 1961), Mexican politician
Adriana Vigneri (born 1939), Italian academic, lawyer, and politician
Adriana Vilagoš (born 2004), Serbian javelin thrower
Adriana Villagrán (born 1956), Argentine tennis player
Adriana Volpe (born 1973), Italian TV presenter, model and actress
Adriana Xenides (1956–2010), Australian television personality

Family name
Bèto Adriana (1925–1997), sportsman who represented the Netherlands Antilles at the Olympics
Sharnol Adriana (born 1970), Curaçaoan-Dutch baseball player and coach

Fictional characters
Adriana Cramer, fictional character on the American daytime drama One Life to Live
Adriana La Cerva, fictional character on the HBO TV series The Sopranos

Adrianna
 Adrianna Bertola (born 1999), English actress and singer
 Adrianna Biedrzyńska (born 1962), Polish actress
 Adrianna Costa (born 1981), American television personality
 Adrianna Foster (born 1986), Mexican singer of soul, jazz, and pop
 Adrianna Franch (born 1990), American soccer goalkeeper
 Adrianna Freeman, American singer-songwriter who specializes in country music and Americana
 Adrianna Górna (born 1996), Polish handballer
 Adrianna Hicks (born 1989), American actress
 Adrianna Lamalle (born 1982), French hurdler
 Adrianna Płaczek (born 1993), Polish handballer
 Adrianna So (born 1992), Filipina actress
 Adrianna Sułek (born 1999), Polish pentathlon athlete

Fictional characters
Adrianan Wow, fictional character on the Singaporean TV series The Noose
Adrianna "Ade" Tate-Duncan is a fictional character on The CW television series 90210, the fourth series in the Beverly Hills, 90210 franchise. Portrayed by Jessica Lowndes
Adrianna (Adrian Pennino) Pennino-Balboa is a fictional character from the Rocky series, played by Talia Shire.

References

Italian feminine given names
Spanish feminine given names
Portuguese feminine given names
English feminine given names
Romanian feminine given names
Dutch feminine given names